The history of Cantieri di Pisa (Pisa Shipyards) began in 1945 Pisa. The company became famous during the 1960s and 1970s when it began developing a particular line of yachts with names inspired by celestial constellations: Pegasus, Saturno, Jupiter, Polaris and Kitalpha. An additional model, the Akhir, quickly become the company's iconic vessel and helped make the Cantieri di Pisa name famous all over the world. In 2015 was acquired by Mondomarine.

References

Further reading

 "Nautica, Mondomarine Savona si aggiudica i cantieri di Pisa". IVG.  
 di Danilo Renzullo (20 April 2015). "Mondomarine punta i Cantieri di Pisa". il Tirreno.  
 "I Cantieri di Pisa sono salvi: Mondomarine annuncia l’acquisto". il Tirreno. 1 May 2015. 
 "Cantieri di Pisa new Akhir 42 superyacht". Gemma Fottles, superyachttimes.com, 2015-09-28.

External links 
 Homepage of Cantieri di Pisa

Shipbuilding companies of Italy
Shipyards of Italy
Companies based in Pisa